Persatuan Sepak Bola Barito Putera, also known as Barito Putera, is an Indonesian professional football club based in Banjarbaru, South Kalimantan. The club currently competes in the Liga 1.

History

Foundation and Galatama era (1988–1994)

Barito Putera was founded in 1988 by H.A. Sulaiman. H.B and participated in the 1988–89 Galatama season with players such as Fachri Amiruddin, Abdillah and Sir Yusuf Huawe. Their first manager was M Hatta and Andi Lala was their first coach. For the 1990 season, they signed Frans Sinatra Huwae, who would later be their captain and club legend, and Sukma Sejati as coach. The next year, Sukma Sejati was replaced by Maryoto, who previously coached Frans Sinatra Huwae in Diklat Ragunan. Salahuddin joined Barito and was called to the Indonesia national football team for the 1991 Southeast Asian Games, where he won the gold medal. In late 1992, Maryoto was replaced by Andi Teguh because he was appointed as the national team coach. Andi Teguh managed to guide Barito Putera to a third-placed finish in the 1992–93 Galatama season with players such as Frans Sinatra Huwae, Salahuddin, Zainuri, Yusuf Luluporo, Abdillah, Albert Korano, Fahmi Amiruddin, Samsul Bahri, Joko Hariyono, Heriansyah and Saiman. In the last season of Galatama, Daniel Roekito replaced Andi Teguh and Buyung Ismu was one of the most feared striker in Indonesia.

Modern era and recent history (1994–present)

Led by manager H Rahmadi HAS, they started their first season in the merged Liga Indonesia Premier Division by finishing as a semifinalist after being defeated by then champion Persib Bandung 1–0. In 1995, Daniel Roekito was replaced by Bulgarian coach A. Soso, who is their first and only foreign coach until now. In 1996 Maryoto again joined Barito replacing A. Soso. In 1997, Maryoto and A. Soso became a duet coaching Barito. Between 1999 and 2002, Rudy William Keltjes and Tumpak Sihite coached Barito.

Despite coached by Frans Sinatra Huwae, because of financial problems, Barito Putera was relegated to the Liga Indonesia First Division in 2003. Their crisis continued and they were relegated to the Liga Indonesia Second Division in 2004, despite changing their coach to Gusti Gazali. There were rumours that the club was bankrupt, but was later denied by manager Hasnuriyadi. Zainal Hadi HAS was then appointed as manager and he appointed Salahuddin as coach. Finally in 2008, they won the Liga Indonesia Second Division, and earned promotion to the Liga Indonesia First Division. In 2010, Barito finished in top eight position and were promoted to the Liga Indonesia Premier Division with players such as Sugeng Wahyudi, Husin Mugni, Dwi Permana, Zulkan Arief, Adre Djoko and Sartibi Darwis.

Ten years after relegated to the Liga Indonesia First Division, they became champion of the 2011–12 Liga Indonesia Premier Division by beating Persita Tangerang 2–1 and got returned to the highest professional level competition for football clubs in Indonesia, the Indonesia Super League. On June 14, 2015, H. Abdussamad Sulaiman Haji Basirun, the founder and chairman of Barito Putera, died in Jakarta.

Crest and stadium

Stadium 
They usually play their home games at 17 May Stadium.

For the 2013 Indonesia Super League, they play their home matches at Demang Lehman Stadium. They will again use 17 May Stadium for their home matches in the 2015 Indonesia Super League after renovation finished in December 2014.

In 2019 Liga 1 season, they back to Demang Lehman Stadium because 17 May Stadium is renovated again.

Culture

Supporters 
Barito Putera is have some supporter groups that spread in almost of all territory of South Kalimantan province, and other Indonesian regions.

Derbies 
Derby Papadaan

The match of Barito Putera against Borneo F.C. are called the "Derby Papadaan" means the Brother/Family Derby.

Derby Banua

The match of Barito Putera against Martapura F.C. also called "Derby Banua" because both of the teams are originally from South Kalimantan (Banua).

Retired number 

88 (number of the club)

Honours 
Galatama
Third Place: 1992–93
Liga Indonesia Premier Division
Winners: 2011–12 (second-tier era)
Semi-finals: 1994–95 (first-tier era)
 Liga Indonesia Second Division
Winners: 2008–09

Season-by-season records 

QR Qualification Round
NP Not Participated

Note:
3rd position with Pupuk Kaltim. Knockout rounds are only statistics, not counting points.
 PS Barito Putera did not take part in the league
 Knockout rounds are only statistics, not counting points.
 Knockout rounds are only statistics, not counting points.
 League was suspended.
 Indonesia Soccer Championship A is an unofficial competition replacing Indonesia Super League which was suspended.
 The season was abandoned due to the COVID-19 pandemic and declared void on 20 January 2021

Rank
World clubs ranking

AFC clubs ranking

Players

Current squad

Out on loan

Coaching Staff

All time

Managers

Head coaches

Captains

Top scores
Players in bold are still active in Club. Statistics are counted in official league matches

Sponsorship and kits

Title and shirt sponsors

Current sponsors
Main sponsors

Hasnur Group

Other sponsors

PT. Maming Enam Sembilan

Youth academy 
Hasnur Group and Barito Putera supports the development of long-term sports by establishing Barito Putera Sports School (SOBP) which has begun its activities for football sports since April 2016 in the city of Banjarmasin. SOBP has been initiated as a positive distribution container for students ' hobbies, interests and talents. SOBP also directed to be an integral part of formal education in a well-managed school will bring positive influence and benefits for students, among them can hone skills, power creativity, soul sportsmanship and achievement.

See also 
 List of football clubs in Indonesia
 Borneo F.C.
 Persija Jakarta
 Banjarbaru
 Indonesia national football team

References

External links 
Official Website  
 Fans site 
 Barito Putera at Liga Indonesia
 Official Instagram
 PS Barito Putera Profile on Eyesoccer Football Database

Banjarbaru
 
Football clubs in Indonesia
Football clubs in South Kalimantan
Association football clubs established in 1988
1988 establishments in Indonesia
Indonesian Premier Division winners